Jeon Mi-seon (December 7, 1970 – June 29, 2019) was a South Korean actress. Though best known as a supporting actress in films and television series such as Memories of Murder (2003), Moon Embracing the Sun (2012), and Hide and Seek (2013), Jeon Mi-seon also played the leading role in Love Is a Crazy Thing (2005).

Death
Jeon was found dead by hanging at a hotel in Jeonju on June 29, 2019, in what police have described as a likely suicide.  She was 48.

Filmography

Film

Television series

Music video

Theater

Awards and nominations

References

External links 
 Jeon Mi-seon at Sim Entertainment  (former agency)
 
 
 

1970 births
2019 deaths
20th-century South Korean actresses
21st-century South Korean actresses
South Korean film actresses
South Korean television actresses
South Korean stage actresses
Seoul Institute of the Arts alumni
2019 suicides
Suicides by hanging in South Korea
Female suicides